Mihai-Viorel Fifor (born 10 May 1970) is a Romanian politician.

Born in Turnu Severin, he attended school in his native city, entering the University of Craiova in 1989. He graduated in 1994, with a degree in Romanian and English. The same institution awarded him a master's degree in Romanian literature the following year, and a doctorate in 2003, dealing with the Timok Romanians. In 2001, he became director of the Dolj County center for preserving and promoting traditional culture. In 2005, he was named head of the Oltenia regional museum.

A member of the Social Democratic Party (PSD), he was elected to the Senate in 2012, representing Dolj County. In 2016, he won another term, switching to Arad County. In June 2017, he became Economy Minister in the cabinet of Prime Minister Mihai Tudose. In September 2017 he became Defence Minister. He was reappointed to the same position in January 2018 in the Dăncilă Cabinet.  He resigned from the Cabinet on 19 November 2018 to concentrate on party internal affairs and election-preparatory actions.

References

External links

21st-century Romanian politicians
1970 births
Directors of museums in Romania
Living people
Members of the Senate of Romania
People from Drobeta-Turnu Severin
Social Democratic Party (Romania) politicians
University of Craiova alumni
Romanian Ministers of Economy
Romanian Ministers of Defence